The 2003 WNBA season was the seventh for the New York Liberty. The Liberty fell one game short for the playoffs, also missing the postseason for the first time since 1998.

Offseason

Dispersal Draft

WNBA Draft

Regular season

Season standings

Season schedule

Player stats

References

New York Liberty seasons
New York
New York Liberty